The 2000 All-Ireland Senior Camogie Championship Final was the 69th All-Ireland Final and the deciding match of the 2000 All-Ireland Senior Camogie Championship, an inter-county camogie tournament for the top teams in Ireland.

The match was of a very high quality and Tipperary won by 5.

References

All-Ireland Senior Camogie Championship Finals
|All-Ireland Senior Camogie Championship Final
All-Ireland Senior Camogie Championship Final
All-Ireland Senior Camogie Championship Final, 2000